Bobbie Allen Howard, Jr. (born June 14, 1977) is a former professional American football player who played linebacker for three seasons for the Chicago Bears. Howard Grew up in West Virginia, Playing in the same High School as Jason Williams and Randy Moss. He later attended Notre Dame and served as a tri-captain his senior year. He later was signed as a Undrafted Free Agent with the Chicago Bears. Howard is now the defensive coordinator and theology instructor for St. Laurence High School in Burbank, Illinois. He was a high school teammate of Randy Moss. He later starred in the 30 for 30 ESPN film  "Rand University".

References

1977 births
Living people
Sportspeople from Charleston, West Virginia
Players of American football from West Virginia
American football linebackers
Notre Dame Fighting Irish football players
Chicago Bears players